Pekka "Juha" Rantasila (born June 5, 1945) is a Finnish former professional ice hockey player who played in the SM-liiga. He played for Porin Karhut and HIFK. Rantasila was inducted into the Finnish Hockey Hall of Fame in 1989. Currently, he works a lawyer.

External links
Finnish Hockey Hall of Fame page.

1945 births
Living people
20th-century Finnish lawyers
HIFK (ice hockey) players
Ice hockey players at the 1968 Winter Olympics
Ice hockey players at the 1972 Winter Olympics
Karhut Pori players
Olympic ice hockey players of Finland
Sportspeople from Pori
21st-century Finnish lawyers